Jack Elliott Myers (November 29, 1941 – November 23, 2009), was an American poet and educator. He was Texas Poet Laureate in 2003, and served on the faculty of Southern Methodist University in Dallas for more than 30 years. He was director of creative writing at SMU from 2001 through 2009. Myers co-founded The Writer's Garret, a nonprofit literary center in Dallas, with his wife, Thea Temple. He published numerous books of and about poetry, and served as a mentor for aspiring writers at SMU and as part of the writers' community and mentoring project of The Writer's Garret.

Early life
Jack Myers was born in Lynn, Massachusetts, to Jewish parents Alvin G. and Ruth L. Myers, and developed an interest in writing and poetry at a young age. In his twenties he worked many odd jobs to support his self-directed study of poetry.

Early career
In 1968 Jack Myers married his first wife, Nancy Leppert, and a year later they had their first son. Myers earned his Bachelor of Arts degree in English literature from the University of Massachusetts Amherst in 1970. After finishing his degree, he moved his family to Iowa where he was accepted into the famed Iowa Writers' Workshop. He became friends with his professor, Dick Hugo, whom he later honored with the Festschrift, A Trout in the Milk: A Composite Portrait of Richard Hugo, in 1980.

His second son was born in Iowa in 1972.

Later career
After obtaining his Master of Fine Arts in Poetry Writing, Myers moved his family to Dallas in 1975 when he was hired as an assistant professor of English at Southern Methodist University.

In 1981 Myers became a "Field Faculty" member of Vermont College, and in June of that year married his second wife, Willa Robins. This union produced two children.

In 1981 he also became the Program Chair of SMU's English Department and served on many committees. During this time he wrote hundreds of poems; edited anthologies; and published The Longman Dictionary of Poetic Terms, a chapbook, and two collections of poetry. One of these, As Long As You're Happy, won the 1985 National Poetry Series (selected by Nobel laureate Seamus Heaney).

In 1993, Myers met his third wife, Thea Temple, at an AWP conference in Norfolk, Virginia. They were married six months later. This union led to a literary partnership and the most productive period of Myers' life, including the founding of the non-profit literary center, The Writer's Garret in Dallas.

Final years
From 1993 until his death, Myers published nine books of and about poetry, taught at six universities, chaired the board of The Writer's Garret, directed the creative writing program at SMU, appeared on radio and television talking about writing and poetry, edited magazines, and founded the Writers' Community and Mentorship Project (CAMP). He also won awards for his writing and teaching.

Myers was named the Poet Laureate of Texas in 2003, and the city of Mesquite honored him with "Jack Myers Day".

Video

Appearances
KERA-radio, Think, w/Kris Boyd, for National Poetry Month, April 2007
Arts & Letters Live, commissioned poem for multi-media event, April 2007
The Art of Living, a 26-part national TV series, New Leaf TV, a network devoted to healthy lifestyles
KERA-radio, Glen Mitchell Show, "What Poetry Means to Dallas", March 9, 2005
Texas House of Representatives and Senate: Introducing resolution of 2003 Texas Poet Laureate (May/2003)
ABC's Wide World of Sports, "Fathers and Sons in Golf", June 21, 2003
Mesquite City Council, Proclamation of "Jack Myers Day", June 2, 2003

Books
The Memory of Water, New Issues Press, Spring 2011. A volume of poems.
Routine Heaven, Texas Review Press, 2005. Volume of poems.
The Poet's Portable Workshop, Wadsworth/Thomson College Textbooks, 2004
Dictionary of Poetic Terms, North Texas State University, 2003
The Glowing River: New & Selected Poems, Invisible Cities Press, 2001
OneOnOne, Autumn House Press, Pittsburgh, 1999. A volume of poems.
Human Being, Rancho Loco Press, Dallas, 1998, a chapbook of poems.
Leaning House Poets, Vol. 1, Leaning House Records, Dallas, 1996. A CD/anthology of works by seven nationally known poets, co-edited with Mark Elliott.
Blindsided, David R. Godine, Inc., Boston, 1993. A volume of poems.
New American Poets of the 90s, David R. Godine, Inc., Boston, 1991. An anthology of contemporary poetry co-edited with Roger Weingarten (3rd printing)
A Profile of Twentieth-Century American Poetry, Southern Illinois University Press, Carbondale, 1991. A critical/aesthetic history co-edited with David Wojahn.
As Long as You're Happy, Graywolf Press, Saint Paul, 1986. Winner of the 1985 National Poetry Series Open Competition (selected by Nobel laureate Seamus Heaney)
The Longman Dictionary of Poetic Terms, Longman, Inc., New York, 1985. A reference work co-edited with Michael Simms (paperback edition, 1988). Revised edition, 1995.
New American Poets of the 80s, Wampeter Press, Key West, 1984. An anthology of contemporary poetry co-edited with Roger Weingarten.
Coming to the Surface, Trilobite Press, Denton, TX, 1984. A chapbook of poems.
I'm Amazed That You're Still Singing, L'Epervier Press, Seattle, 1981. A full volume of poems.
A Trout in the Milk: A Composite Portrait of Richard Hugo, Confluence Press, Lewiston, ID, 1980. Festschrift.
The Family War, L'Epervier Press, Fort Collins, CO, 1977. A volume of poems. (1978 Texas Institute of Letters Award, finalist in Elliston Small Press Book Award)
Will It Burn, Falcon Publishing, Boston, 1974. Poems with photographs by David Akiba.
Black Sun Abraxas, Halcyone Press, Boston, 1970. A book of poems.

Essays and poems in anthologies, textbooks, and recordings
Breathe: 101 Contemporary Odes, Ryan Van Cleave and Chad Prevost, ed., C & R Press, 2008.
The Weight of Addition: An Anthology of Texas Poetry, Mutabilis Press, Houston, 2008.
A Student's Texas Treasury of Verse, TCU Press, 2008.
Joyful Noise: An Anthology of American Spiritual Poetry, ed. Robert Strong, Autumn House Press, 2007.
Open Book: Essays from the Postgraduate Writers' Conference, Featherstone & Weingarten, eds., Cambridge Scholars Press, UK, 2006
Under the Rock Umbrella: Contemporary American Poets, 1951–1977, Wm. Walsh, ed., Mercer University Press, 2006.
The Autumn House Anthology of American Poems and Prayers, ed. Robert Strong, Autumn House Press, 2006.
Manthology: Poems of the Male Experience, David R. Godine, 2006
The Giant Book of Poetry, ed. William Roetzheim, Level Four Press, 2006
180 More: Extraordinary Poems for Every Day, ed. Billy Collins, Random House, 2005
Is This Forever or What?: Poems & Paintings from Texas (Greenwillow Press, 2004)
Stand Up for Poetry: For the Page & the Stage, University of Iowa Press, 2002
Poets of the New Century, David R. Godine, 2002
Essential Love, ed., Ginny Lowe, Grayson Books, 2000.
American Diaspora: Poetry of Exile, Univ. of Iowa Press, 2000
Clockpunchers: Poetry of America's Workplace, Partisan Press, 2000
The Body Electric, W.W. Norton, 2000
Poems and Their Sources, The Literary Review Press, 2000
Who Are the Rich and Where Do They Live?, Poetry East Special Edition, 2000
Best of American Poetry Review, W.W. Norton, New York, 2000.
My Business Is Circumference: Influence & Mastery, Paul Dry Books, Philadelphia, 2000
What Have You Lost? William Morrow, 2000
Best Texas Poetry 2, Fire Wheel Editions, 1999
Best Texas Poetry 1, Fire Wheel Editions, 1998
Leaning House Poets I, CD/anthology of poetry, Leaning House Records, Dallas, 1996
Inheritance of Light, anthology, University of North Texas Press, 1996
Seneca Review 25-Year Retrospective, 1995
Heartcore: Inspirations for Healthy Sexual Intimacy (HarperCollins, 1996)
Dog Music: A Poetry Anthology (St. Martin's Press, 1996)
Articulations: Contemporary Poetry About Medicine (Univ. of Iowa Press, 1995)
Texas in Poetry: A 150 Year Anthology (Center for Texas Studies, 1994)
Sports in America (Witness, Wayne State University Press, 1995)
Stand Up Poetry (California State University Press, Long Beach, 1993)
The Art and Craft of Poetry (Writers' Digest/North Light Books, 1993)
The Practice of Poetry (Harper Books, 1992)
Celebrating Men (forthcoming poetry anthology)
New American Poets of the 90s (David R. Godine, 1992)
The Texas Poetry Anthology (Corona Press, 1991)
The Best of Crazy Horse (University of Arkansas, 1991)
Anthology of Magazine Verse and Yearbook of American Poetry (Monitor Pub., 1985)
New American Poets of the 80s (Wampeter Press, 1984)
Ohio Review Ten-Year Retrospective (Ohio University Press, 1984)
The Poet's Choice: 100 American Poets (Tendril Press, 1980)
Anthology of Magazine Verse and Yearbook of American Poetry (Monitor Pub., 1980)
Voices Within the Ark: Modern Jewish Poets (Avon, 1980)
Texas Poetry Anthology, 1979
Texas Stories and Poems, 1977
Travois, 1976
The American Poetry Anthology: Poets Under 40 (Avon, 1975)
Intro #4, 1972
Anthology of College Poetry, 1964

References

 Jack Myers Curriculum Vita – Courtesy the Writer's Garret
 In Memoriam: Jack Elliott Myers – Courtesy The Writer's Garret

External links
The Writer's Garret

1941 births
2009 deaths
People from Lynn, Massachusetts
American male poets
Poets Laureate of Texas
20th-century American poets
20th-century American male writers